Tim Rose (born October 14, 1941) is an American football coach and former player.  He is currently the defensive coordinator at Ashland University, a position he has held since the 2009 season.  Rose served as the head football coach at Miami University from 1983 to 1989, compiling a record of 31–44–3.  He has over 20 years of experience as a defensive coordinator at the college level including stints at Miami, the University of Memphis, the University of Cincinnati, the University of Minnesota, Boston College, East Carolina University, Eastern Michigan University, Louisiana Tech University and the University of Toledo.

Coaching career
Rose served as the head coach at Miami University in Oxford, Ohio from 1983 to 1989.  He led the 1986 Miami squad to the Mid-American Conference championship and a berth in the California Bowl.  That season, Rose orchestrated perhaps the biggest win in the program's history with a 21–12 victory over #8 ranked LSU in Baton Rouge.  Even with his success in 1986, Rose only had two winning seasons in seven years at Miami and finished his tenure there with a record of 31–44–3 that included a streak of 20 games without a victory between 1987 and 1989.  After the 1989 season, Rose's contract was not renewed and he was replaced by Randy Walker.  Rose was the first coach since Edwin Sweetland in 1911 to leave Miami with a losing record. In 1999, while serving as defensive coordinator at East Carolina University, Rose was named as a finalist for the Broyles Award, given annually to the nation's top college football assistant coach.

Family
Rose is the father of Kurt Rose, an American football coach working in Japan as the head coach of the X-League's Tokyo Gas Creators, the company team for Tokyo Gas.

Head coaching record

College

References

External links
 Ashland profile

1941 births
Living people
Ashland Eagles football coaches
Boston College Eagles football coaches
East Carolina Pirates football coaches
Eastern Michigan Eagles football coaches
Cincinnati Bearcats football coaches
Place of birth missing (living people)
Miami RedHawks football coaches
Louisiana Tech Bulldogs football coaches
Minnesota Golden Gophers football coaches
Memphis Tigers football coaches
Toledo Rockets football coaches
Xavier Musketeers football players
High school football coaches in Colorado
High school football coaches in Ohio
Players of American football from Cleveland
Coaches of American football from Ohio